Daniel Joseph MacDonald,  (July 23, 1918 – September 30, 1980) was a Canadian politician from Prince Edward Island.  He served as Minister of Veterans Affairs from 1972 to 1979 and again in 1980 until his death.

Life
He was born on his family's farm in Bothwell, Prince Edward Island and was educated in a one-room schoolhouse.

At the age of 20, he bought his own farm at Bothwell Beach. In 1940, he enlisted in The Prince Edward Island Highlanders to fight in World War II. He was transferred to the Cape Breton Highlanders in 1943 and fought with the rank of sergeant in Italy, where he was wounded during the assault on the Gothic Line. He returned to his unit after a few weeks and was seriously wounded on December 21, 1944, during the Battle of Senio River. As a result, his left arm and leg were amputated. Undiscouraged by his injuries, he returned to his farm, married a local woman named Pauline Peters, built a house, and raised seven children: Blair, Heather, Gail, Daniel, Leo, Walter, and Gloria. The singer-songwriter Jenn Grant is a granddaughter.

Political career
In 1962, he was elected to the Prince Edward Island House of Assembly and sat in the body for ten years. He served as Minister of Agriculture and Forestry from 1966 to 1972, when he resigned to run in the 1972 federal election. Elected as the Liberal Member of Parliament for Cardigan, he was appointed to the Cabinet of Pierre Trudeau as Minister of Veterans Affairs. He was defeated in the 1979 federal election but returned in the 1980 election and was then reappointed to the Veterans Affairs portfolio. MacDonald reformed veterans' pensions to make them more generous and introduced disability pensions and pensions for prisoners of war.

In the late 1970s, Prime Minister Pierre Elliott Trudeau undertook an initiative to decentralize government away from Ottawa. He and MacDonald devised the plan to move the headquarters of the Department of Veterans Affairs from Ottawa to Charlottetown, Prince Edward Island. The department's head office, along with the Veterans Review and Appeal Board, have been located in the Daniel J. MacDonald Building (the "DJM") in PEI's capital ever since. (In the early 21st century, a second building two blocks from the DJM, the Jean Canfield Building (the "JCB"), was constructed to house other federal government offices, including some from Veterans Affairs Canada.) The department has become a major economic contributor to PEI, and has had an important impact on Charlottetown's cultural landscape.

MacDonald died in office on September 30, 1980 and was given a state funeral. The eulogy was given by Prime Minister Trudeau at St. Dunstan's Cathedral, in Charlottetown.

Electoral history

References
Department of Veterans Affairs biography

1918 births
1980 deaths
People from Kings County, Prince Edward Island
Canadian Roman Catholics
Members of the House of Commons of Canada from Prince Edward Island
Members of the King's Privy Council for Canada
Liberal Party of Canada MPs
Prince Edward Island Liberal Party MLAs
Members of the Executive Council of Prince Edward Island
Canadian Army personnel of World War II
Canadian Army soldiers